Allassani is a surname. Notable people with the surname include:

 Reise Allassani (born 1996), English footballer
 J. H. Allassani (1906–?), Ghanaian teacher and politician

Other
 Allasani Peddana, famous Telugu poet

See also
 Alassane